Khoekhoen (singular Khoekhoe) (or Khoikhoi in the former orthography; formerly also Hottentots, a term now considered offensive) are the traditionally nomadic pastoralist indigenous population of southwestern Africa. They are often grouped with the hunter-gatherer San (literally "Foragers") peoples. The designation "Khoekhoe" is actually a kare or praise address, not an ethnic endonym, but it has been used in the literature as an ethnic term for Khoe-speaking peoples of Southern Africa, particularly pastoralist groups, such as the !Ora, !Gona, Nama, Xiri and ǂNūkhoe nations. 

While the presence of Khoekhoen in Southern Africa predates the Bantu expansion, according to a scientific theory based mainly on linguistic evidence, it is not clear when the Khoekhoen began inhabiting the areas where the first contact with Europeans occurred (possibly in the Late Stone Age). At that time, in the 17th century, the Khoekhoen maintained large herds of Nguni cattle in the Cape region. They mostly gave up nomadic pastoralism in the 19th to 20th century. 

Their Khoekhoe language is related to certain dialects spoken by foraging San peoples of the Kalahari, such as the Khwe and Tshwa, forming the Khoe language family. The main Khoekhoe subdivisions today are the Nama people of Namibia, Botswana and South Africa (with numerous clans), the ǂNūkhoeǃhaos of Namibia, the !Orana clans of South Africa (such as ǀHõakhoena or AmaNgqosini), the Xirikua or Griekwa nation of South Africa, and the AmaGqunukhwebe or !Gona clans which fall under the Xhosa-speaking polities.

The Xirikua clans (Griqua) developed their own ethnic identity in the 19th century and settled in Griqualand. They are related to the same kinds of clan formations as the Rehoboth Basters, who could also be considered a "Khoekhoe" people.

History

Early history
The broad ethnic designation of "Khoekhoen", meaning the peoples originally part of a pastoral culture and language group to be found across Southern Africa, is thought to refer to a population originating in the northern area of modern Botswana. This culture steadily spread southward, eventually reaching the Cape approximately 2,000 years ago. "Khoekhoe" groups include ǀAwakhoen  to the west, and ǀKx'abakhoena of South and mid-South Africa, and the Eastern Cape. Both of these terms mean "Red People", and are equivalent to the IsiXhosa term "amaqaba". Husbandry of sheep, goats and cattle grazing in fertile valleys across the region provided a stable, balanced diet, and allowed these lifestyles to spread, with larger groups forming in a region previously occupied by the subsistence foragers. Ntu-speaking agriculturalist culture is thought to have entered the region in the 3rd century AD, pushing pastoralists into the Western areas. The example of the close relation between the ǃUriǁ’aes (High clan), a cattle keeping population, and the !Uriǁ’aeǀ’ona (High clan children), a more-or-less sedentary forager population (also known as "Strandlopers"), both occupying the area of ǁHuiǃgaeb, shows that the strict distinction between these two lifestyles is unwarranted, as well as the ethnic categories that are derived. Foraging peoples who ideologically value non-accumulation as a social value system would be distinct, however, but the distinctions among “Khoekhoe pastoralists”, “San hunter-gatherers” and “Bantu agriculturalists” do not hold up to scrutiny, and appear to be historical reductionism.

Arrival of Europeans
Khoe-speaking peoples traded with seafarers from all over the globe for centuries, going back into ancient times, and this undoubtedly included some Europeans, perhaps even Roman vessels, but Portuguese explorers and merchants are the first to record their contacts, in the 15th and 16th centuries A.D. The ongoing encounters were often violent. In 1510, at the Battle of Salt River, Francisco de Almeida and fifty of his men were killed and his party were defeated by ox-mounted !Uriǁ’aekua ("Goringhaiqua" in Dutch approximate spelling), which was one of the so-called Khoekhoe clans of the area that also included the !Uriǁ’aeǀ’ona ("Goringhaicona", also known as "Strandlopers"), said to be the ancestors of the !Ora nation of today. In the late 16th century, Portuguese, French, Danish, Dutch and English but mainly Portuguese ships regularly continued to stop over in Table Bay en route to the Indies. They traded tobacco, copper and iron with the Khoekhoe-speaking clans of the region, in exchange for fresh meat. 

Local population dropped after smallpox contagion was spread through European activity. The Khoe-speaking clans suffered high mortality as immunity to the disease was rare. This increased, as military conflict with the intensification of the colonial expansion of the United East India Company that began to enclose traditional grazing land for farms. Over the following century, the Khoe-speaking peoples were steadily driven off their land, resulting in numerous northwards migrations, and the reformulation of many nations and clans, as well as the dissolution of many traditional structures.

"Khoekhoe" social organisation was thus profoundly damaged by the colonial expansion and land seizure from the late 17th century onwards. As social structures broke down, many Khoekhoen settled on farms and became bondsmen (bondservants, serfs) or farm workers; others were incorporated into clans that persisted. Georg Schmidt, a Moravian Brother from Herrnhut, Saxony, now Germany, founded Genadendal in 1738, which was the first mission station in southern Africa, among the Khoe-speaking peoples in Baviaanskloof in the Riviersonderend Mountains.

The colonial designation of "Baasters" came to refer to any clans that had European ancestry in some part and adopted certain Western cultural traits. Though these were later known as Griqua (Xirikua or Griekwa) they were known at the time as "Basters" and in some instances are still so called, e. g., the Bosluis Basters of the Richtersveld and the Baster community of Rehoboth, Namibia, mentioned above.

Arguably responding to the influence of missionaries, the states of Griqualand West and Griqualand East were established by the Kok dynasty; these were later absorbed into the Cape Colony of the British Empire.

Beginning in the late 18th century, Oorlam communities migrated from the Cape Colony north to Namaqualand. They settled places earlier occupied by the Nama. They came partly to escape Dutch colonial conscription, partly to raid and trade, and partly to obtain herding lands. Some of these emigrant Oorlams (including the band led by the outlaw Jager Afrikaner and his son Jonker Afrikaner in the Transgariep) retained links to Oorlam communities in or close to the borders of the Cape Colony. In the face of gradual Boer expansion and then large-scale Boer migrations away from British rule at the Cape, Jonker Afrikaner brought his people into Namaqualand by the mid-19th century, becoming a formidable force for Oorlam domination over the Nama and against the Bantu-speaking Hereros for a period.

Kat River settlement (1829–1856) and Khoena in the Cape Colony

By the early 1800s, the remaining Khoe-speakers of the Cape Colony suffered from restricted civil rights and discriminatory laws on land ownership. With this pretext, the powerful Commissioner General of the Eastern Districts, Andries Stockenstrom, facilitated the creation of the "Kat River" Khoe settlement near the eastern frontier of the Cape Colony. The more cynical motive was probably to create a buffer-zone on the Cape's frontier, but the extensive fertile land in the region allowed people to own their land and build communities in peace. The settlements thrived and expanded, and Kat River quickly became a large and successful region of the Cape that subsisted more or less autonomously. The people were predominantly Afrikaans-speaking !Gonakua, but the settlement also began to attract other diverse groups.

Khoekua were known at the time for being very good marksmen, and were often invaluable allies of the Cape Colony in its frontier wars with the neighbouring Xhosa politics. In the Seventh Frontier War (1846–1847) against the Gcaleka, the Khoekua gunmen from Kat River distinguished themselves under their leader Andries Botha in the assault on the "Amatola fastnesses". (The young John Molteno, later Prime Minister, led a mixed commando in the assault, and later praised the Khoekua as having more bravery and initiative than most of his white soldiers.)

However, harsh laws were still implemented in the Eastern Cape, to encourage the Khoena to leave their lands in the Kat River region and to work as labourers on white farms. The growing resentment exploded in 1850. When the Xhosa rose against the Cape Government, large numbers Khoeǀ’ona joined the Xhosa rebels for the first time. After the defeat of the rebellion and the granting of representative government to the Cape Colony in 1853, the new Cape Government endeavoured to grant the Khoena political rights to avert future racial discontent. Attorney General William Porter was famously quoted as saying that he "would rather meet the Hottentot at the hustings, voting for his representative, than meet him in the wilds with his gun upon his shoulder". Thus, the government enacted the Cape franchise in 1853, which decreed that all male citizens meeting a low property test, regardless of colour, had the right to vote and to seek election in Parliament. However, this non-racial principle was eroded in the late 1880s by a literacy test, and later abolished by the Apartheid Government.

Massacres in German South-West Africa

From 1904 to 1907, the Germans took up arms against the Khoekhoe group living in what was then German South-West Africa, along with the Herero. Over 10,000 Nama, more than half of the total Nama population at the time, may have died in the conflict. This was the single greatest massacre ever witnessed by the Khoekhoe people.

Culture

Religion
The religious mythology of the Khoe-speaking cultures gives special significance to the Moon, which may have been viewed as the physical manifestation of a supreme being associated with heaven. Thiǁoab (Tsui'goab) is also believed to be the creator and the guardian of health, while ǁGaunab is primarily an evil being, who causes sickness or death. Many Khoe-speakers have converted to Christianity and Nama Muslims make up a large percentage of Namibia's Muslims.

World Heritage
UNESCO has recognised Khoe-speaking culture through its inscription of the Richtersveld as a World Heritage Site. This important area is the only place where transhumance practices associated with the culture continue to any great extent.

The International Astronomical Union named the primary component of the binary star Mu¹ Scorpii after the traditional Khoekhoe language name Xami di mûra ('eyes of the lion').

List of Khoekhoe peoples
The classification of Khoekhoe peoples can be broken down roughly into two groupings: Northern Khoekhoe & Southern Khoekhoe (Cape Khoe).

Northern Khoekhoe

The Northern Khoekhoe are referred to as the Nama or Namaqua and they have among them 11 formal clans:
 Khaiǁkhaun (Red Nation) at Hoachanas, the main group and the oldest Nama clan in Namibia
 ǀKhowesen (Direct descendants of Captain Hendrik Witbooi) who was killed in the battle with Germans on 29 October 1905. The |Khowesin, reside in modern-day Gibeon under the leadership of Ismael Hendrik Witbooi the 9th Gaob (meaning captain) of the |Khowesen Gibeon, situated 72 km south of Mariental and 176 km north of Keetmanshoop just off the B1, was originally known by the name Khaxa-tsûs. It received its name from Kido Witbooi first Kaptein of the ǀKhowesin.
 ǃGamiǂnun (Bondelswarts) at Warmbad
 ǂAonin (Southern Topnaars) at Rooibank
 ǃGomen (Northern Topnaars) at Sesfontein
 ǃKharakhoen (Fransman Nama) at Gochas. After being defeated by Imperial Germany Schutztruppe in the Battle of Swartfontein on 15 January 1905, this Nama group split into two. Part of the ǃKharakhoen fled to Lokgwabe, Botswana, and stayed there permanently, the part that remained on South West African soil relocated their tribal centre to Amper-Bo. In 2016 David Hanse was inaugurated as chief of the clan.
 ǁHawoben (Veldschoendragers) at Koës
 !Aman at Bethanie which was led by Cornelius Frederick
 ǁOgain (Groot Doden) at Schlip
 ǁKhauǀgoan (Swartbooi Nama) at Rehoboth, later at Salem, Ameib, and Franzfontein
 Kharoǃoan (Keetmanshoop Nama) under the leadership of Hendrik Tseib split from the Red Nation in February 1850 and settled at Keetmanshoop.

Among the Namaqua are also the Oorlams who are a southern Khoekhoe people of mixed-race ancestry that trekked northwards over the Orange River and where absorbed into the greater Nama identity. The Oorlams themselves are made up of 5 smaller clans:
 ǀAixaǀaen (Orlam Afrikaners), the first group to enter and permanently settle in Namibia. Their leader Klaas Afrikaner left the Cape Colony around 1770. The clan first built the fortress of ǁKhauxaǃnas, then moved to Blydeverwacht, and finally settled at Windhoek.
 ǃAman (Bethanie Orlam) subtribe settled at Bethanie at the turn of the eighteenth century.
 Kaiǀkhauan (Khauas Nama) subtribe formed in the 1830s, when the Vlermuis clan merged with the Amraal family. Their home settlement became Naosanabis (now Leonardville), which they occupied from 1840 onward. This clan ceased to exist after military defeat by Imperial German Schutztruppe in 1894 and 1896.
 ǀHaiǀkhauan (Berseba Orlam) subtribe formed in 1850, when the Tibot and Goliath families split from the ǃAman to found Berseba.
 ǀKhowesin (Witbooi Orlam) subtribe was the last to take up settlement in Namibia. They originated at Pella, south of the Orange River. Their home town became Gibeon.

These Namaqua inhabit the Great Namaqualand region of Namibia.
There are also minor Namaqua clans that inhabit the Little Namaqualand regions south of the Orange River in north western South Africa.

Southern Khoekhoe (Cape Khoe)

The southern band of Khoekhoe peoples (Sometimes also called the Cape Khoe) inhabit the Western Cape and Eastern Cape Provinces in the south western coastal regions of South Africa. They are further divided into 4 subgroups, Eastern Cape Khoe, Central Cape Khoe, Western Cape Khoe and Peninsular Cape Khoe.

The Eastern Cape Khoe
 Hoengeyqua
 Damasonqua
 Gonaqua

Central Cape Khoe
 Inqua (also called "Humcumqua")
 Houtunqua
 Gamtobaqua (possible historical subgroup of the Houtunqua)
 Attaqua
 Gouriqua
 Chamaqua

Western Cape Khoe
 Chainouoqua
 Hawequa (also called "Obiqua". possible historical subgroup of the Chainouqua)
 Cochoqua
 Hessequa
 Chairiguriqua

Peninsular Cape Khoe
Goringhaiqua: The Goringhaiqua are a single tribal authority made from the two houses of the Goringhaikona & Gorachouqua.

Early European theories about Khoekhoe origins 
European theories about the origins of the Khoekhoe are historically interesting in their own right. Of the European theories proposed, notable is that summarised in the commissioned Grammar and Dictionary of the Zulu Language. Published in 1859, this put forward the idea of an origin from Egypt that appears to have been popular amongst men of learning in the region. The reasoning for this included the (supposed) distinctive Caucasian elements of the Khoekhoe's appearance, a "wont to worship the moon'", an apparent similarity to the antiquities of Old Egypt, and a "very different language" to their neighbours. The Grammar says that "the best philologists of the present day ... find marked resemblances between the two". This conviction is echoed in an introduction to the Zulu language, which avidly often comments upon the language's various resemblances to Hebrew.

See also

 Herero and Namaqua genocide
 Nama people
 San religion
 Griqua people
 History of South Africa
 Khoisan
 Sarah Baartman (1789–1815), aka "Hottentot Venus", South African Khoekhoe woman exploited as a freak show attraction in Europe

Notes

References

Further reading
 P. Kolben, Present State of the Cape of Good Hope (London, 1731–38);
 A. Sparman, Voyage to the Cape of Good Hope (Perth, 1786);
 Sir John Barrow, Travels into the Interior of South Africa (London, 1801);
 Bleek, Wilhelm, Reynard the Fox in South Africa; or Hottentot Fables and Tales (London, 1864);
 Emil Holub, Seven Years in South Africa (English translation, Boston, 1881);
 G. W. Stow, Native Races of South Africa (New York, 1905);
 A. R. Colquhoun, Africander Land (New York, 1906);
 L. Schultze, Aus Namaland und Kalahari (Jena, 1907);
 Meinhof, Carl, Die Sprachen der Hamiten (Hamburg, 1912);
 Richard Elphick, Khoikhoi and the Founding of White South Africa (London, 1977)

External links

 Cultural Contact in Southern Africa by Anne Good for the Women in World History website
 An article on the history of the Khoikhoi
 The Khoekhoe People of Southern Africa

 
Indigenous peoples of Southern Africa
Ethnic groups in Namibia
Ethnic groups in South Africa
African nomads
Reduplicants
Ancient peoples
History of Africa
Cape Colony people